The 17205 / 17206 Sainagar Shirdi–Kakinada Port Express is an Express train belonging to Indian Railways South Coast Railway zone that run between  and  in India.

Service 
It operates as train number 17205 from Sainagar Shirdi to Kakinada Port and as train number 17206 in the reverse direction serving the states of Maharashtra, Karnataka, Telangana & Andhra Pradesh.

Coaches

The 17205 / 06 Sainagar Shirdi–Kakinada Port  Express has two AC 2-tier,  three AC 3-tier, ten sleeper class, four general unreserved & 2 SLR (EoG with luggage rake) coaches. It does not carry a pantry car.

As with most train services in India, coach composition may be amended at the discretion of Indian Railways depending on demand.

Routing

Rake sharing

17203 / 17204 – Bhavnagar Terminus–Kakinada Port Express

Traction

Coach composition

References

External links
17205 Sainagar Shirdi Kakinada Port Express at India Rail Info
17206 Kakinada Port Sainagar Shirdi Express at India Rail Info

Express trains in India
Rail transport in Maharashtra
Rail transport in Karnataka
Rail transport in Telangana
Rail transport in Andhra Pradesh
Transport in Kakinada
Transport in Shirdi